Ocenebra is a genus of predatory sea snails, marine gastropod mollusks in the subfamily Ocenebrinae  of the family Muricidae, the murex and rock snails.

Species
Species with accepted names within the genus Ocenebra include according to the World Register of Marine Species (WoRMS) :

 Ocenebra aparicioae Cunningham Aparicio, 2020
 Ocenebra brevirobusta Houart, 2000
 Ocenebra chavesi Houart, 1996
 Ocenebra edwardsii (Payraudeau, 1826) 
 Ocenebra erinaceus (Linnaeus, 1758) 
 † Ocenebra etteri Landau & Houart, 2014 
 Ocenebra helleri (Brusina, 1865) 
 Ocenebra hispidula (Pallary, 1904) 
 Ocenebra hybrida (Aradas & Benoit, 1876) 
 Ocenebra ingloria (Crosse, 1865) 
 Ocenebra inordinata Houart & Abreu, 1994
 Ocenebra leukos (Houart, 2000) 
 Ocenebra miscowichae (Pallary, 1920) 
 Ocenebra nicolai (Monterosato, 1884) 
 Ocenebra paddeui (Bonomolo & Buzzurro, 2006) 
 Ocenebra piantonii (Cecalupo, Buzzurro & Mariani, 2008) 
 † Ocenebra prionotus (Tate, 1888) 
 Ocenebra purpuroidea (Pallary, 1920) 
 Ocenebra salahi T. Cossignani & Ahuir, 2021
 Ocenebra vazzanai Crocetta, Houart & Bonomolo, 2020
 †Ocenebra vindobonensis (Hörnes, 1853) 

Species inquirendum
 Ocenebra juritzi (Barnard, 1969) 

 Species brought into synonymy 
 Ocenebra acanthophora (A. Adams, 1863): synonym of Ocinebrellus acanthophorus (A. Adams, 1863)
 Ocenebra angolensis Odhner, 1922: synonym of Orania fusulus (Brocchi, 1814) (synonym)
 Ocenebra atropurpurea Carpenter, 1865: synonym of Paciocinebrina atropurpurea (Carpenter, 1865) (original combination)
 Ocenebra brevirostra [sic]: synonym of Ocenebra brevirobusta Houart, 2000 (lapsus in abstract)
 Ocenebra cala (Pilsbry, 1897): synonym of Urosalpinx cala (Pilsbry, 1897) (unaccepted combination)
 Ocenebra circumtexta Stearns, 1871: synonym of Paciocinebrina circumtexta (Stearns, 1871)
 Ocenebra contracta (Reeve, 1846)  synonym of Ergalatax contracta (Reeve, 1846)
 Ocenebra coseli Houart, 1989: synonym of Africanella coseli (Houart, 1989) (original combination)
 Ocenebra crispatissima Berry, 1953: synonym of Paciocinebrina crispatissima (Berry, 1953) (original combination)
 Ocenebra erinacea (Linnaeus, 1758) - sting winkle : synonym of  Ocenebra erinaceus (Linnaeus, 1758) but still: synonym of a valid name by the ICZN (Op. 886) 
 Ocenebra erronea (Monterosato in Poirier, 1883): synonym of Ocinebrina hispidula (Pallary, 1904): synonym of Ocenebra hispidula (Pallary, 1904)
 Ocenebra fairiana Houart, 1979: synonym of Pteropurpura fairiana (Houart, 1979) (original combination)
 Ocenebra fasciata (G. B. Sowerby II, 1841): synonym of Inermicosta inermicosta (Vokes, 1964)
 Ocenebra fenestrata : synonym of Muricodrupa fenestrata (Blainville, 1832)
 Ocenebra erronea (Monterosato in Poirier, 1883): synonym of Ocinebrina hispidula (Pallary, 1904): synonym of Ocenebra hispidula (Pallary, 1904)
 Ocenebra fairiana Houart, 1979: synonym of Pteropurpura fairiana (Houart, 1979) (original combination)
 Ocenebra fasciata (G. B. Sowerby II, 1841): synonym of Inermicosta inermicosta (Vokes, 1964)
 Ocenebra gibbosa (Lamarck, 1822): synonym of Jaton decussatus (Gmelin, 1791)
 Ocenebra hayesi Lorenz, 1995: synonym of Vaughtia hayesi (Lorenz, 1995) (original combination)
 Ocenebra inermicosta Vokes, 1964 : synonym of Inermicosta inermicosta (Vokes, 1964)
 Ocenebra inornata (Récluz, 1851): synonym of Ocinebrellus inornatus (Récluz, 1851)
 Ocenebra interfossa Carpenter, 1864: synonym of Paciocinebrina interfossa (Carpenter, 1864) (original combination)
 Ocenebra intermedia (C. B. Adams, 1850): synonym of Favartia alveata (Kiener, 1842)
 Ocenebra isaacsi Houart, 1984: synonym of Africanella isaacsi (Houart, 1984) (original combination)
 Ocenebra jenksii F. C. Baker, 1889: synonym of Haustrum vinosum (Lamarck, 1822): synonym of Bedeva vinosa (Lamarck, 1822) (synonym)
 Ocenebra keenae Bormann, 1946: synonym of Paciocinebrina barbarensis (Gabb, 1865)
 † Ocenebra keepi Arnold, 1903 : synonym of † Paciocinebrina squamulifera (Carpenter, 1869) 
 Ocenebra levicula (Dall, 1889): synonym of Favartia levicula (Dall, 1889)
 Ocenebra lumaria Yokoyama, 1926: synonym of Ocinebrellus lumarius (Yokoyama, 1926) (original combination)
 Ocenebra lurida (Middendorff, 1848): synonym of Paciocinebrina lurida (Middendorff, 1848)
 Ocenebra michaeli Ford, 1888: synonym of Urosalpinx subangulata (Stearns, 1873)
 Ocenebra minor (Dall, 1919): synonym of Paciocinebrina minor (Dall, 1919)
 Ocenebra newmani Lorenz, 1990: synonym of Vaughtia dunkeri (F. Krauss, 1848) 
 Ocenebra poulsoni Carpenter, 1864: synonym of Roperia poulsoni (Carpenter, 1864) (original combination)
 Ocenebra purpuroides (Reeve, 1845): synonym of Vaughtia purpuroides (Reeve, 1845)
 Ocenebra rosea (Reeve, 1846): synonym of Muricopsis rosea (Reeve, 1846)
 Ocenebra rubra F. C. Baker, 1891: synonym of Paciocinebrina atropurpurea (Carpenter, 1865)
 Ocenebra sclera (Dall, 1919) : synonym of Paciocinebrina sclera (Dall, 1919)
 Ocenebra scrobiculata (Philippi, 1846): synonym of Vaughtia scrobiculata (Dunker, 1846)
 Ocenebra seftoni Chace, 1958: synonym of Paciocinebrina seftoni (Chace, 1958) (original combination)
 Ocenebra sloati Hertlein, 1958: synonym of Coralliophila orcuttiana Dall, 1919
 Ocenebra sperata (Cossmann, 1921): synonym of Urosalpinx sperata (Cossmann, 1921): synonym of Hadriania sperata (Cossmann, 1921)
 Ocenebra subangulata (Stearns, 1873) : synonym of Urosalpinx subangulata (Stearns, 1873)
 Ocenebra wardiana F. C. Baker, 1891: synonym of Ocinebrina aciculata (Lamarck, 1822)

References

External links
 Gray, J. E. (1847). On the classification of the British Mollusca by W E Leach. Annals and Magazine of Natural History. (1) 20: 267-273.
 Monterosato, T. A. di. (1917). Molluschi viventi e quaternari raccolti lungo le coste della Tripolitania dall'ing. Camillo Crema. Bollettino della Società Zoologica Italiana. ser. 3, 4: 1-28, pl. 1

 
Ocenebrinae